The Siri thesis is a conspiracy theory held by a small minority of traditionalist Catholics which asserts that the conservative Cardinal Giuseppe Siri, then the Archbishop of Genoa, was elected pope in the 1958 papal conclave, taking the name Pope Gregory XVII, but that his election was suppressed. Siri did not associate himself with this idea.

Its exponents claim that a prolonged emission of white smoke on the first day of balloting at the conclave indicated the election of Siri, but that threats applied from outside the conclave caused his election to be reversed, allowing Pope John XXIII to be elected two days later. The source of the threats has been identified variously as Freemasons and agents of the Soviet Union. Adherents of the Siri thesis say that the election of John XXIII was invalid. They regard him and his successors as imposters and antipopes.

1958 conclave
On 25 October 1958, 51 cardinals entered the papal conclave, which was held to elect a successor to Pope Pius XII. Cardinal Giuseppe Siri, then 52 years old, was considered a strong candidate in the election. Siri was viewed then, and throughout his life, as staunchly conservative.

At 11:53a.m. on the morning of 26 October, the first day of balloting, white smoke was seen coming from the chimney of the Sistine Chapel, a traditional signal to the crowds in the square outside that a pope has been elected. It was followed after a few minutes by black smoke. The Italian radio network and the Italian news agency had to retract their initial reports that a pope had been elected. Something similar happened in the afternoon at 5:53p.m. when the smoke again appeared white. At 6p.m., after the smoke had continued white for several minutes, Vatican Radio told the world: "The smoke is white... There is absolutely no doubt. A Pope has been elected." After about half an hour, the smoke turned black, indicating that there was no result. Vatican Radio corrected its report. The New York Times said that "The crowd lingered for more than a half hour, apparently hoping against hope that a new Pope would appear." The paper reported that problems getting the straw to catch fire likely caused the morning’s problem and said "The second signal was misunderstood because it came well after nightfall. The smoke was lighted from below by a spotlight, which made black appear white."

The official responsible for arrangements outside the conclave notified the cardinals that the colour of the smoke had been misread and provided them with "smoke torches from a fireworks factory". The third day's four ballots again failed to select a pope and there was no confusion about the colour of the smoke. On the afternoon of the next day, 28 October, white smoke signalled the election of a pope. On their eleventh ballot the conclave had elected Cardinal Angelo Roncalli, who took the name John XXIII.

While Siri was considered a favourite for election before the conclave, he did not feature in the early voting, and ultimately was never in the running. He was thought too young at 52; a long pontificate would have been anticipated, and this was allegedly felt to be undesirable because a long pontificate would have prevented other cardinals who wanted to be elected pope from having the chance of being elected.

History of the thesis
Sometime in the late 1980s, an American traditionalist Catholic named Gary Giuffre began to expound the belief that Siri was the true pope, and that he was being held against his will in Rome. According to Giuffre and supporters of the theory, the white smoke that was seen on 26 October 1958 did indeed mean that a pope had been elected, and that pope was Siri, but he was forced to surrender the papacy in the face of dire threats from outside the conclave. Giuffre speculates the main threat was that Rome would be destroyed with a thermonuclear weapon, effectively wiping out the entire hierarchy of the Church in one blow. With the electors unsure of how to proceed, Roncalli, who they claim was a Freemason, supposedly offered himself as a compromise with the promise that he would call a synod soon after his election to regularize the unusual situation.  Roncalli was elected as John XXIII instead of Siri. It is claimed Roncalli purposely chose the same name as Antipope John XXIII as an acknowledgment of his irregular status.

The thesis further claims that a similar process occurred at the 1963 conclave that followed John XXIII's death. Once again white smoke was seen indicating that Siri had been elected, and again it turned black and, under threats from outside the conclave, a different cardinal was elected, Giovanni Montini, who took the name Paul VI. During this conclave, it was alleged that the threats of terrible retribution if Siri were elected were passed into the conclave by the B'nai B'rith, working on behalf of a Judeo-Masonic conspiracy.

The assertion that Siri's 1963 election had been set aside after the intervention of the B'nai B'rith was contained in an article written in 1986 by Louis Hubert Remy in a French publication, and translated into English in 1987 for Dan Jones's newsletter, The Sangre de Cristo Newsnotes. That article made no mention of the 1958 conclave. Malachi Martin, in his apocalyptic 1990 book The Keys of This Blood, said that in the 1963 conclave Siri received sufficient votes for election, but refused it. The reason, according to Martin, was that he believed that "only thus could foreseen possibilities of grave danger be avoided—but whether harm to the Church, his family, or to him personally, is not clear." Siri's refusal, he says, followed a conversation on the subject of Siri's candidacy between a member of the conclave and somebody outside it, who was "an emissary of an internationally based organisation". In a 1997 interview on the radio programme Steel on Steel, hosted by John Loefller, Martin claimed that Siri had also obtained a majority of votes in the first 1978 conclave, but that he had received a written note after his election threatening him and his family with death should he accept. Followers of the "Siri thesis" recognize him as "Gregory XVII", and also refer to him as "the Red Pope".

Paul L. Williams, in a 2003 book entitled The Vatican Exposed, claimed that US State Department documents confirmed that Siri had been elected pope in 1958 as Gregory XVII. According to Williams, however, the election was quashed not by a Judeo-Masonic conspiracy, but by fear of the Soviet Union. Roncalli, he claims, was known as the "pink priest" because of his ties with both the French and Italian Communist parties, while Siri was "rabidly anti-Communist". Siri received the requisite number of votes on the third ballot, and was elected as Gregory XVII, but "the French cardinals annulled the results, claiming that the election would cause widespread riots and the assassination of several prominent bishops behind the Iron Curtain." It was then decided to elect Cardinal Federico Tedeschini, but as he was too ill, Roncalli was elected instead. Williams cited "Department of State secret dispatch, 'John XXIII,' issue date: November 20, 1958, declassified: November 11, 1974" and "Department of State secret file, 'Cardinal Siri,' issue date: April 10, 1961, declassified: February 28, 1994" in support of his claims. In subsequent editions, however, the references were changed to simply "F.B.I. source".

Significance
Traditionalist Catholics oppose the liturgical changes and "modernist" theological positions resulting from the Second Vatican Council (1962–1965), which many of them see as a "heretical" council. Sedevacantists are a minority group within traditionalist Catholicism, who maintain that none of the popes from John XXIII (who called the council) onward were true popes, and that therefore the papal seat is vacant. The idea that John XXIII and Paul VI were not true popes, but antipopes, is neatly explained by the Siri thesis: if Siri was elected in 1958, then the election of John, and therefore of all his successors, was invalid. The Catholic magazine Inside the Vatican has referred to adherents of the Siri thesis as "sede impeditists", meaning that they believe there was a true pope, but that he was "impeded" by outside forces from taking his office. The magazine estimated that the thesis was believed "by hundreds, perhaps thousands of people around the world".

Siri's later career
Siri is not recorded as ever having made reference to the "Siri thesis", nor was there any mention of it in his New York Times obituary, in the biography written by Raimondo Spiazzi, or in a speech given by Giulio Andreotti on the centenary of Siri's birth in 2006. He was appointed president of the Italian Episcopal Conference by John XXIII in 1959, and remained in the post under Paul VI until 1964. He sat on the Board of Presidency of the Second Vatican Council from 1963 until its close in 1965. He was a candidate for pope in the 1978 conclave that followed the death of Paul VI, where he is thought to have led in the early ballots before being overtaken by Albino Luciani (John Paul I), and again two months later in the October 1978 conclave, where he is also thought to have come within a few votes of election. He was Archbishop of Genoa from 1946 to 1987, and at the time of his retirement he was "the last remaining active cardinal named by Pope Pius XII."

References

Conspiracy theories involving religion
Sedevacantism
Traditionalist Catholicism